These Promises Are Being Videotaped is the third album by Los Angeles post-rock duo El Ten Eleven. It was released on 15 July 2008.

Track listing
"Jumping Frenchmen of Maine"
"I Like Van  Halen Because My Sister Says They Are Cool"
"Fat Gym Riot"
"Adam and Nathan Totally Kick Ass"
"K10"
"Paranoid Android"
"Chino"
"Numb Tooth"

2008 albums
El Ten Eleven albums
Bar/None Records albums